Shri Chamunda Devi Mandir also known as Chamunda Nandikeshwar Dham is a temple dedicated to Shri Chamunda Devi, a form of Goddess Durga, located at 19 km away from Palampur town in Dharamshala Tehsil of Kangra district of the Northern Indian state of Himachal Pradesh. This is one of the most prominent temples in Himachal Pradesh and one of the most popular all over India. It is believed that whatever vow is prayed here manifests in reality. The much older Aadi Himani Chamunda which is also the original shrine, is situated at the hilltop, making it difficult for pilgrims to reach. Thus, this temple was constructed around 400 years ago for the ease of the believers.

Legend 
This ancient temple is said to have been constructed in the 16th century and has considerable spiritual legend attached to it. According to one folklore, a 16th Century king and a priest prayed to the goddess Chamunda, asking for her consent to shift the idol to a more accessible location. The legend suggests that the goddess appeared in the priest's dream and suggested him the exact location from where the idol would be found. The king was informed of the same and his men recovered the ancient idol and installed it at the place where the temple is built now.

Popularity 
It is one of the most famous temples in India. The Chamunda Devi Temple has always been a tourist attraction for people who visit Palampur. The temple attracts travellers from all parts of India, not only because there are a lot of spiritual legends attached to it, but also because the temple is ancient and because of its Himachali architecture. The ancient idol of Shri Chamunda Devi is a common subject of interest among travellers, photographers and devotees alike. Apart from the plenty of tourists who visit the Chamunda Devi Temple as a major tourist attraction of Palampur, the local residents of the hill town consider it one of the holiest places of worship in the area, especially because of its many legends and history that are attached to it. These residents and other devotees from the neighbouring hill towns visit this temple in order to offer their prayers to the goddess.

A small temple named Jakhni Mata Mandir is situated on a hilltop that overlooks the valley. It is accessible by a short mountain drive.

References 

Temples in India
Hindu temples in Himachal Pradesh